Lihtenberk Castle is a 13th-century castle ruin located in the Municipality of Šmartno pri Litiji in central Slovenia, directly adjacent to the later Bogenšperk Castle. It is best known for a minor association with the 17th-century historian Johann Weikhard von Valvasor, who owned the ruin and styled himself (among other things) "von Lichtenberg."

Architecture

Lihtenberk was a walled castle with a three-story residential palacium, remnants of which are the only element still visible today.

History

The castle first appears in written sources in 1223, in the form of a mention of its then-owner, Aquileian ministerialis Albert de Lihtenberca; the knights von Lichtenberg had taken the castle from the knights Andes, and they from the knights Višjegorski. In 1250, the castle is recorded as castrum Liechtemberch, in 1288 as castrum Leytemberch, in 1338 as Pilgrimum de Liechtenberch, and in 1393 and 1396 simply as Lyechtenberg. Around 1288 the castle was temporarily occupied by Count Meinhard of Tyrol, who gave it out in fief, but the Patriarchate of Aquileia soon intervened to revert the castle to its previous state of ownership.

At the end of the 15th century, the castle was received as dowry by Boltežar the noble Wagen, imperial administrator of the castles of Hošperk by Planina and Šteberk in Cerknica, as well as lord of Kostel Castle near the river Kolpa. By this time the castle was in a very poor state or repair, and the seat of the lordship was moved to the newly built Bogenšperk Castle nearby. The fate of Lihtenberk was sealed by the 1511 Idrija earthquake which badly damaged the building; in 1630 its owner Jurij Kheysell demolished what was left and used the materials for the consolidation and repair of Bogenšperk, a practice continued later in the century by Valvasor.

Sources
 Ivan Jakič, Vsi slovenski gradovi ("All Slovene Castles"), DZS, Ljubljana, 1997, p. 188
 Bogenšperk Castle - official website

Castles in Lower Carniola
Ruined castles in Slovenia